The Thomas County School District is a public school district in Thomas County, Georgia, United States, based in Thomasville. It serves the communities of Barwick, Boston, Coolidge, Meigs, Ochlocknee, Pavo, and Thomasville.

Schools
The Thomas County School District has four elementary schools, one middle school, and two high schools.

Elementary schools
Thomas County Upper Elementary School
Cross Creek Elementary School
Garrison-Pilcher Elementary School
Hand-in-Hand Primary School

Middle school
Thomas County Middle School

High schools
Bishop Hall Charter School
Thomas County Central High School

References

External links

School districts in Georgia (U.S. state)
Education in Thomas County, Georgia